Panino is a rural locality (a selo) and the administrative center of Paninsky Selsoviet of Oktyabrsky District, Amur Oblast, Russia. The population was 202 as of 2018. There are 6 streets.

Geography 
Panino is located 24 km southwest of Yekaterinoslavka (the district's administrative centre) by road. Yuzhny is the nearest rural locality.

References 

Rural localities in Oktyabrsky District, Amur Oblast